Farumad (also Romanized as Forūmad; also known as Fārūmād and Furmāk) is a village in Farumad Rural District, in the Central District of Meyami County, Semnan Province, Iran. At the 2006 census, its population was 1,959, in 616 families.

References 

Populated places in Meyami County